Kubu Gajah is a small town in Larut, Matang and Selama District, Perak, Malaysia.

Larut, Matang and Selama District
Towns in Perak